FYTA (Greek: ΦΥΤΑ, meaning plants) are an Athens-based conceptual art and performance art duo. Their work problematises Greek identity and nationalism. FYTA's work combines different media and disciplines mostly operating within the wider framework of overidentification, queer politics and anti-humanist art, while they aim at a performative destabilisation of concepts of truth  and nature / the natural.

Background 

"Fyta are far from a fringe group in the Greek art world" and curate regular shows working with the Athens queer community as well as producing artefacts of their own. In an article about Greek queer politics and aesthetics, the Journal of Greek Media and Culture described the work of FYTA as “highly iconoclastic”  and “new directors who seem to follow their own path”. Dazed has named their curatorial work as “avant-garde”, while they are also seen as having “an important characteristic often missing by many fine artists: irony and a sense of humour”.

Work 

Their artistic work has been shown at The Scala London, NGBK Berlin, Berlin Porn Film Festival, Cuntemporary London, Bâtiment d'art contemporain, Gdańska Galeria Miejska, the Onassis Cultural Centre, and the Zoumboulakis Gallery. In 2013, they participated at the 4th Athens Biennale, AGORA.

Publications 

The Black Book of FYTA (2017) contains descriptions and photos of FYTA’s work with analyses on arts and politics by academics. It received a distinction at the "Artist Catalogue design" category at the EBGE_Greek Design and illustration awards 2018.

In 2021, they published an article in Studies in Theatre and Performance on their curation of The Garden of Dystopian Pleasures reflecting on the role of critical artistic practice in responding to contemporary right-wing radicalisation.

Academic presentations 

They have given academic presentations at the London College of Communication, Royal Holloway University, Athens School of Fine Arts, Buckinghamshire New University, and the Athens Museum of Queer Arts.

In 2020, they co-curated the conference "Psychoanalysis and Post-Truth" at the Freud Museum in London, in partnership with Waiting Times - a multi-stranded research project on the temporalities of healthcare funded by The Wellcome Trust. The conference presented the work of contemporary thinkers including Yannis Stavrakakis, Renata Salecl, Richard Seymour, Disnovation and ContraPoints.

Opera 

In 2020, they were commissioned by the Greek National Opera to direct a version of Monteverdi's L'Orfeo, but the premiere did not happen because of lockdown measures for the COVID-19 epidemic.

In 2021, the opera was shot as a film titled ORFEAS2021 and will be premiered at the 62nd Thessaloniki Festival. The opera is about the struggles of Orfeas, the first gay prime minister of Greece, against a history of oppression in the “land of heroes.” It is dedicated to the memory of activist Zackie Oh!

Vice said of it "the first queer opera in Greece speaks about the dark side of our society" and Anouchka Grose said it is "both an emotional slap and a powerful piece of political polemic".

List of exhibitions and events 

 2012 On Being Sane in Sunny Places, Panke, Berlin 
 2013 Τα Τρωκτικά / The Great Garbie, Embros Theatre, Athens 
 2013 Fyta Bianella, Athens Biennale 4, Athens  
 2014 ΦΥΤΙΝΗ ιβέντ 1, Coo Cafe Bar, Thessaloniki
 2014 Instant Psyconalysis, Apiary Studios, London  
 2014 Enjoy (y)our State of Emergency, nGBK, Berlin 
 2014 Sound::Gender::Feminism::Activism, London. College of Communication 
 2015 Sound Acts I, KET, Athens 
 2015 Twisting C(r)ash, Le Commune, Geneva  
 2016 Queertafios, Athens Museum of Queer Arts 
 2016 A Politics of Lies, Circuits & Currents, Athens 
 2016 Twisting C(r)ash II, Romantso, Athens 
 2016 Sound Acts II, KET, Athens 
 2016 Rita Sue project, Athens School of Fine Arts 
 2016 Lemonopita, Lage Egal, Berlin 
 2016 Hypnos Project, Onassis Cultural Centre, Athens 
 2016 Conceptual Song-Writing & Object-Oriented Synthesis, Athens Museum of Queer Arts 
 2016 Technology & Transformations, Buckinghamshire New University, High Wycombe 
 2016 The Equilibrists, New Museum & Benaki Museum, Athens (resigned) 
 2016 Zuckerschock!, P71, Berlin 
 2016 Deep Trash: Greek Trash, Bethnal Green Working Men’s Club, London 
 2017 Queer : Unqueer, Atopos cvc (International Museum Day), Athens 
 2017 The Death of Queer, Athens Festival Peiraios 260 
 2017- (ongoing) The ABC of FYTA, podcast, Spotify 
 2017 Sound Acts III, Athens & Epidaurus Festival 
 2017 5 Years of FYTA, Atopos cvc residency, Athens  
 2017 Resurrection with Documena, Baggeion Hotel, Athens 
 2017 Laboratorium Research vol. 2, Gdańska Galeria Miejska, Gdansk 
 2017-8 Waiting for the Barbarians, Athens Biennale 
 2018 Cabaret Negatif, Athens Biennale (cancelled) 
 2018 Queer Approaches to Lena Platonos, Greek National Opera, Athens 
 2018 The Real Athens Queer DIY, Berlin Porn Film Festival, 2018  
 2018 The Garden of Dystopian Pleasures, Athens School of Fine Arts 
 2018 Glam Slam! Cabaret Voltaire, Athens 
 2018 Borderline Offensive, House of Humour, Sofia (resigned) 
 2018 Memes and Online Discourse in Greece, Atopos cvc, Athens 
 2018 Pokémon Poetry, Atopos cvc, Athens 
 2019 The Social Contract & Its Discontents, Athens School of Fine Arts  
 2019 Athens Festival of Queer Performance, Feminist Autonomous Centre for Research, Athens 
 2019 Euronoize, The Scala, London 
 2020 200 Hundred Years of Suffocation, Online Festival 
 2020 Psychoanalysis & Post-Truth, Freud Museum, London 
 2020-21 ORFEAS2020/ORFEAS2021, Greek National Opera, Athens 
 2021 Gardening, Zoumboulakis Gallery, Athens

References

Performance artist collectives
Greek contemporary artists
Art movements